Nicol Crags is a rock crags rising to about 1,300 m to the south of Arkell Cirque in the Read Mountains, Shackleton Range. Photographed from the air by the U.S. Navy, 1967, and surveyed by British Antarctic Survey (BAS), 1968–71. In association with the names of geologists grouped in this area, named by the United Kingdom Antarctic Place-Names Committee (UK-APC) in 1971 after William Nicol (1770–1851), Scottish natural philosopher who devised the Nicol prism and the preparation of thin rock sections, thus contributing to the techniques of microscopy.

Cliffs of Coats Land